The 1987–88 Primera División B was the second category of the Spanish basketball league system during the 1987–88 season.

Format 
28 teams played this season.

First phase
Two groups; called Even and Odd, with 14 teams each, where they all play against everyone in their group at two laps.

Second phase
Group A: Made up of those classified in the 1st, 2nd an 3rd of each group.
Group B: Made up of those classified in the 4th, 5th an 6th of each group.
Group C: Made up of those classified in the 7th, 8th, 9th and 10th of each group.
Group D: Made up of those classified in the 11th, 12th, 13th and 14th of each group.

Promotion
For the promotion playoffs, the teams from groups A, B and the top four from C participate. Before, the clubs from groups A and B play an intermediate round to determine the order of the top 12. They play the best of 3 games the 1st with 2nd, the 3rd with 4th and 5th against 6th of each group. Once the order is determined, they face the first 4 teams of group C during 3 rounds of elimination to the best of 3 games. The 2 winning teams of the last qualifying rounds go up. In all these qualifying rounds, the first and third matches are played at the home of the best classified in the previous phase. The two winners are promoted to the ACB League.

Relegation
The last 4 of group C and the first 4 of D play the relegation playoff in a tie to the best of 5 games, where the first, second and fifth games are played at the home of the best classified in the previous phase. The losers go down to Segunda Division.
The last four of group D go down directly to the Segunda Division.

Teams

Promotion and relegation (pre-season) 
A total of 28 teams contested the league, including 22 sides from the 1986–87 season, two relegated from the 1986–87 ACB, one promoted from the Segunda División and three Wild Cards.

Teams relegated from Liga ACB
Leche Río Breogán
Clesa Ferrol

Teams promoted from Segunda División
Caja San Fernando

Wild Cards
Galeones Celta
Salesianos Las Palmas
Ten-Sur

Venues and locations

First Round

Group Odd

Group Even

Second Round

Group A

Group B

Group C

Group D

PlayOffs

Intermediate playoff 
Matches played to determine the final ranking.

|}

Promotion playoffs 

Third round winners are promoted to Liga ACB.

Relegation playoffs 

|}

Final standings

References

External links
League at JM Almenzar website
hispaligas.net

Primera División B de Baloncesto
1987–88 in Spanish basketball
Second level Spanish basketball league seasons